This is a list of high schools in the state of Michigan.

Alcona County
 Alcona Community Schools, Lincoln

Alger County

 Burt Township K-12 School, Grand Marais
 Munising Baptist School (K-12), Wetmore
 Munising High School, Munising
 Superior Central School (K-12), Eben Junction

Allegan County
 Allegan County Area Technical & Education Center
 Allegan Alternative High School
 Allegan High School
 East Martin Christian High School, Martin
 Fennville High School, Fennville
 Hamilton High School, Hamilton
 Holland Christian High School, Holland
 Hopkins High School, Hopkins
 Martin High School, Martin
 Otsego Baptist Academy (K-12), Otsego
 Otsego High School, Otsego
 Plainwell High School, Plainwell
 Renaissance High School, Plainwell
 Saugatuck High School, Saugatuck
 Wayland Union High School, Wayland

Alpena County
 Alpena High School, Alpena
 ACES Academy, Alpena

Antrim County
 Alba Public School (K-12), Alba
 Bellaire High School, Bellaire
 Central Lake High School (6-12), Central Lake
 North Central Academy (K-12), Mancelona
 Elk Rapids High School, Elk Rapids
 Ellsworth Community School (K-12), Ellsworth
 Mancelona High School, Mancelona

Arenac County
 Arenac Eastern High School, Twining
 Au Gres-Sims High School, Au Gres
 Standish-Sterling Central High School, Standish

Baraga County
 Baraga Junior/Senior High School (7-12), Baraga
 L'Anse High School, L'Anse

Barry County
 Barry County Christian School (K-12), Hastings
 Cedar Creek Christian School (K-12), Delton
 Delton-Kellogg Alternative High School, Delton
 Delton-Kellogg High School, Delton
 Hastings High School, Hastings
 Lakewood High School, Lake Odessa
 Thornapple-Kellogg High School, Middleville

Bay County
 Bay City Public Schools
 Bay City Central High School, Bay City
 Bay City Western High School, Auburn
 Wenona Center High School, Bay City
 All Saints Central High School, Bay City
 Bay-Arenac Community High School, Essexville
 Bible Baptist School (8-12), Pinconning
 Garber High School, Essexville
 John Glenn High School, Bay City (actually located in Bangor Township)
 Pinconning Advancement Academy (7-12), Pinconning
 Pinconning Area High School, Pinconning

Benzie County
 Benzie Central High School, Benzonia
 Frankfort High School, Frankfort

Berrien County
 Benton Harbor High School (10-12), Benton Harbor
 Andrews Academy, Berrien Springs
 Berrien Springs High School, Berrien Springs
 Brandywine Middle/Senior High School, Niles
 Bridgman High School, Bridgman
 Buchanan High School, Buchanan
 Coloma High School, Coloma
 Countryside Academy (K-12), Benton Harbor
 Eau Claire Middle-High School, Eau Claire
 Grace Christian School, Watervliet
 Jesus Christ Academy (2-12), Buchanan
 Lake Michigan Catholic High School, St. Joseph
 Lakeshore High School, Stevensville
 Michigan Lutheran High School, St. Joseph
 New Buffalo High School, New Buffalo
 Niles High School, Niles
 Our Lady of the Lake Catholic High School, St. Joseph
 River Valley Middle/High School, Three Oaks
 St. Joseph High School, St. Joseph
 Watervliet Senior High School, Watervliet

Branch County
 Branch Area Career Center, Coldwater
 Bronson Junior/Senior High School, Bronson
 Coldwater High School, Coldwater
 Fiske International School (8-12), Coldwater
 Pansophia Academy (K-12), Coldwater
 Quincy High School, Quincy

Calhoun County
 Athens High School, Athens
 Battle Creek Central High School, Battle Creek
 Bedford Bible Church School (K-12), Battle Creek
 Cooks Prairie Baptist School (1-11), Homer
 Harper Creek High School, Battle Creek
 Homer Community School, Homer
 Lakeview High School, Battle Creek
 Maple Grove Christian Academy (1-11), Marshall
 Marshall High School, Marshall
 Pennfield Senior High School, Battle Creek
 South Hill Academy, Battle Creek
 St. Philip Catholic Central High School, Battle Creek
 Tekonsha Senior High School, Tekonsha
 Union City High School, Union City

Cass County
 Calvary Bible Academy (K-11), Dowagiac
 Dowagiac Union High School, Dowagiac
 Edwardsburg High School, Edwardsburg
 Marcellus High School, Marcellus
 Ross Beatty Junior/Senior High School, Cassopolis

Charlevoix County
 Beaver Island Community School, Beaver Island
 Boyne City High School, Boyne City
 Boyne Falls Public School (K-12), Boyne Falls
 Charlevoix High School, Charlevoix
 Concord Academy Boyne, Boyne City
 East Jordan High School, East Jordan
 Northwest Academy, Charlevoix

Cheboygan County
 Cheboygan Area High School, Cheboygan
 Inland Lakes High School, Indian River
 Northern Michigan Christian Academy (K-12), Burt Lake
 Wolverine Middle/High School, Wolverine

Chippewa County
 Brimley Middle/High School, Brimley
 DeTour High School, De Tour Village
 Malcolm High School, Sault Ste Marie
 Maplewood Baptist Academy (K-12), Kinross
 Ojibwe Charter School (K-12), Bay Mills, Brimley
 Pickford High School, Pickford
 Rudyard High School, Rudyard
 Sault Area High School, Sault Ste Marie
 Whitefish Township Community School (K-12), Paradise

Clare County
 Clare High School, Clare
 Clare-Gladwin Day School (K-12), Clare
 Farwell High School, Farwell
 Farwell Timberland Alternative High School, Farwell
 Harrison High School, Harrison
 Pioneer High School, Clare

Clinton County
 Bath High School, Bath
 DeWitt High School, DeWitt
 Fowler High School, Fowler
 Ovid-Elsie High School, Elsie
 Pewamo-Westphalia Junior/Senior High School, Pewamo
 St. Johns High School, St. Johns
 Wilson Center Alternative Education, St. Johns

Crawford County
 Calvary Baptist Academy (K-12), Grayling
 Grayling High School, Grayling

Delta County
 Bark River-Harris High School, Harris
 Big Bay de Noc High School, Cooks
 Escanaba Senior High School, Escanaba
 Bay Middle College (Formerly Fitzharris Alternative High School), Escanaba
 Gladstone Area High School, Gladstone
 Mid-Peninsula High School, Rock
 Rapid River High School, Rapid River

Dickinson County
 Iron Mountain High School, Iron Mountain 
 Kingsford High School, Kingsford
 North Dickinson County School (K-12), Felch
 Norway High School, Norway

Eaton County
 Bellevue High School, Bellevue
 Charlotte High School, Charlotte
 Eaton Rapids High School, Eaton Rapids
 Grand Ledge High School, Grand Ledge
 Maple Valley Junior/Senior High School, Vermontville
 Mount Olivet Christian School (1-12), Bellevue
 Olivet High School, Olivet
 Potterville High School, Potterville
 Sawdon High School, Grand Ledge
 Waverly High School, Lansing

Emmet County
 Alanson-Littlefield High School, Alanson
 Concord Academy Petoskey (K-12), Petoskey
 Harbor Light Christian School, Harbor Springs
 Harbor Springs High School, Harbor Springs
 Mackinaw City High School (7-12), Mackinaw City
 Pellston High School, Pellston
 Petoskey High School, Petoskey
 St. Michael the Archangel Regional Catholic Academy, Petoskey

Genesee County

 Beecher High School, Beecher
 Clio Area High School, Clio
 Elisabeth Ann Johnson High School, Mt. Morris
 Flushing High School, Flushing
 Genesee Junior/Senior High School, Genesee
 Goodrich High School, Goodrich
 Grand Blanc Community High School, Grand Blanc
 Hill-McCloy High School, Montrose
 LakeVille Memorial High School, Otisville
 Linden High School, Linden
 Swartz Creek High School, Swartz Creek

Burton

 Atherton High School
 Bendle High School
 Bentley High School
 Faithway Christian School (K-12)
 Genesee Christian School
 Judson Christian Academy (K-12)
 St. Thomas More Academy
 Valley Christian Academy

Davison

 Davison High School
 Faith Baptist School (K-12)

Fenton

 Fenton High School
 Lake Fenton High School
 Southern Lakes Academy

Flint

 Accelerated Learning Academy
 Carman-Ainsworth High School
 Southwestern Classical Academy
 Grace Christian Academy (5-12)
 Hamady High School
 International Academy of Flint (2-12)
 Kearsley High School
 Michigan School for the Deaf
 Mott Middle College
 Mount Morris Alternative Education
 New Standard Academy
 Powers Catholic High School
 Richfield Christian Academy (1-11)
 Richfield Public School Academy
 Valley School

Gladwin County
 Beaverton High School, Beaverton
 Gladwin Community Alternative High School
 Gladwin High School, Gladwin
 Skeels Christian School (K-12), Gladwin

Gogebic County
 Gogebic County Community Education, Bessemer
 A.D. Johnston Senior/Junior High School (7-12), Bessemer
 Wakefield-Marenisco School (K-12), Wakefield
 Watersmeet Township School (K-12), Watersmeet
 Luther L. Wright Middle School/High School, Ironwood

Grand Traverse County
 Grand Traverse Academy (K-12), Traverse City
Interlochen Center for the Arts, Interlochen
Kingsley High School, Kingsley
 St. Francis High School, Traverse City
 The Greenspire School, Traverse City
Traverse City Area Public Schools
Traverse City High School (alternative), Traverse City
Traverse City Central High School, Traverse City
Traverse City West Senior High School, Traverse City
 Traverse City Christian Junior-Senior High School (7-12), Traverse City

Gratiot County
 Alma High School, Alma
 Ashley High School, Ashley
 Breckenridge High School, Breckenridge
 Fulton High School, Middleton
 Ithaca High School, Ithaca
 St. Louis High School, St. Louis

Hillsdale County
 Bird Lake Bible School (K-12), Osseo
 Camden-Frontier High School, Camden
 Freedom Farm Christian School (K-12), Pittsford
 Hillsdale Academy, Hillsdale
 Hillsdale Alternative High School, Hillsdale
 Hillsdale High School, Hillsdale
 Jonesville High School, Jonesville
 Litchfield High School, Litchfield
 New Hope Christian School, Camden
 New Hope United Brethren School, Camden
 North Adams High School, North Adams
 Phoenix Alternative Secondary School, Jonesville
 Pittsford High School, Pittsford
 Reading Junior-Senior High School, Reading
 Waldron Area School, Waldron
 Will Carleton Academy, Hillsdale

Houghton County
 Calumet-Laurium-Keweenaw High School, Calumet, Michigan
 Chassell Township School, Chassell, Michigan
 Copper Country Christian School, Chassell, Michigan
 Dollar Bay-Tamarack City High School, Dollar Bay, Michigan
 Hancock Central High School (Hancock, Michigan), Hancock, Michigan
 Houghton High School, Houghton, Michigan
 Jeffers High School, Painesdale, Michigan
 Lake Linden–Hubbell High School, Lake Linden, Michigan

Huron County
 Bad Axe High School, Bad Axe
 Caseville Public School, Caseville
 Harbor Beach High School, Harbor Beach
 Laker High School, Pigeon
 North Huron Secondary School (7-12), Kinde
 Owendale-Gagetown High School, Owendale
 Port Hope Community School (K-12), Port Hope
 Ubly Community High School, Ubly

Ingham County

 Dansville High School, Dansville
 East Lansing High School, East Lansing
 Haslett High School, Haslett
 Leslie High School, Leslie
 Okemos High School, Okemos
 Stockbridge Junior / Senior High School, Stockbridge
 Webberville High School, Webberville
 Williamston High School, Williamston

Holt

 Capitol City Baptist School (K-12)
 Central Lutheran High School
 Holt Central High School
 Holt High School

Lansing

 Eastern High School
 Everett High School
 Ingham Alternative High School
 J.W. Sexton High School
 Lansing Baptist School (1-12)
 Lansing Catholic High School
 Lansing Christian School (K-12)
 New Covenant Christian School (K-12)

Mason

 Mason High School
 Wilson Talent Center

Ionia County
 Belding Alternative Education, Belding
 Belding High School, Belding
 Douglas R. Welch High School, Ionia
 Faith Christian School (K-12), Lake Odessa
 Ionia High School, Ionia
 Lakewood High School, Lake Odessa
 Portland High School, Portland
 Saranac High School, Saranac
 St. Patrick High School, Portland

Iosco County
 Greenbush Christian Academy (K-11), Greenbush
 Hale High School, Hale
 Living Truth Learning Center (K-11), Hale
 Oscoda High School, Oscoda
 Pinecrest School (6-12), Hale
 Tawas Area High School, Tawas City
 Whittemore-Prescott High School, Whittemore

Iron County
 Iron River Christian Academy, Iron River, Michigan
 Forest Park High School, Crystal Falls, Michigan
 West Iron County High School, Iron River, Michigan

Isabella County
 Beal City School (K-12), Mount Pleasant
 Morey Charter School (K-12), Shepherd
 Mount Pleasant High School, Mount Pleasant
 Oasis High School, Mount Pleasant
 Odyssey Middle/High School, Mount Pleasant
 Sacred Heart Academy High School, Mount Pleasant
 Shepherd Senior High School, Shepherd

Jackson County

 Columbia Central High School, Brooklyn
 Concord High School, Concord
 Grass Lake High School, Grass Lake
 Hanover-Horton High School, Horton
 Michigan Center Jr/Sr High School, Michigan Center
 Napoleon High School, Napoleon
 Springport High School, Springsport
 Western High School, Parma

Jackson

 Da Vinci High School
 East Jackson Secondary School
 Jackson Christian High School
 Jackson High School
 Lumen Christi Catholic School
 Northwest Alternative High School
 Northwest High School
 Vandercook Lake High School

Kalamazoo County

 Climax-Scotts High School, Climax
 Galesburg-Augusta High School, Galesburg
 Gull Lake High School, Richland
 Schoolcraft High School, Schoolcraft
 Vicksburg High School, Vicksburg

Kalamazoo

 Comstock High School/Comstock Compass High School
 Hackett Catholic Central High School
 Heritage Christian Academy (K-12)
 Kalamazoo Area Math and Science Center (KAMSC)
 Kalamazoo Christian High School
 Kalamazoo Central High School
 Kalamazoo Innovative Learning Center
 Loy Norrix High School
 Phoenix High School

Parchment

 Barclay Hills Education Center
 Parchment High School

Portage

 Portage Central High School
 Portage Northern High School

Kalkaska County
 Forest Area Community Schools, Fife Lake - South Boardman
 Kalkaska High School, Kalkaska
 Northside Alternative High School, Kalkaska

Kent County

 Caledonia High School, Caledonia
 Comstock Park High School, Comstock Park
 Discovery Alternative High School, Kelloggsville
 East Grand Rapids High School, East Grand Rapids
 Englishville Alternative High School, Sparta Township
 Forest Hills Eastern High School, Ada
 Grandville High School, Grandville
 Lowell High School, Lowell
 Rockford High School, Rockford
 Sparta High School, Sparta
 Thornapple-Kellogg High School, Middleville

Byron Center

 Byron Center High School
 Byron Center Charter School (K-12)
 The Learning Center Academy (K-12)
 Zion Christian School (K-12)

Cedar Springs

 Cedar Springs High School
 Creative Technologies Academy (K-12)
 New Beginnings Alternative High School
 Pilgrim Bible Academy (1-12)

Grand Rapids

Public Schools

 Alternative Pathways High School
 City High-Middle School
 Forest Hills Central High School
 Forest Hills Northern High School
 Gateway Middle/High School
 Godwin Heights High School
 Grand Rapids Montessori Public School (K-12)
 Innovation Central High School
 Kelloggsville High School
 Kenowa Hills High School
 Kent Career Technical Center
 Kent Innovation High
 Northview High School
 Ottawa Hills High School
 Union High School
 West Michigan Aviation Academy (9-12)

Private Schools

 Calvin Christian High School
 Catholic Central High School
 Grand Rapids Adventist Academy (K-12)
 Grand Rapids Christian High School
 Lake Michigan Academy (1-12)
 Lincoln School (K-12)
 North Hills Classical Academy (K-12)
 NorthPointe Christian Schools (K-12)
 Plymouth Christian High School (7-12)
 South Christian High School
 St. John's Home School (K-12)
 West Catholic High School

Kent City

 Algoma Christian School (K-12)
 Kent City High School

Kentwood

 Crossroads Alternative High School
 East Kentwood High School
 West Michigan Lutheran High School

Walker

 Covenant Christian High School
 West Michigan Academy of Environmental Science (K-12)

Wyoming

 CLC Network (K-12)
 Horizons Community High School
 Lee High School
 Omega High School
 Potter's House High School
 Rogers High School
 Southwest Secondary (6-12)
 Tri-Unity Christian High School
 Vision Quest Alternative High School
 Wyoming Park High School
 Wyoming High School

Keweenaw County
 Horizons Alternative High School, Mohawk, Michigan

Lake County
 Baldwin Senior High School, Baldwin

Lapeer County
 Almont High School, Almont
 Dryden High School (7-12), Dryden
 Imlay City High School, Imlay City
 Lapeer High School, Lapeer
 Lapeer East High School, Lapeer
 Lapeer West High School, Lapeer
 North Branch High School, North Branch
 Quest High School, North Branch
 Venture High School, Imlay City

Leelanau County
 Glen Lake Community School, Maple City
 The Leelanau School, Glen Arbor
 Leland Public School (K-12), Leland
 Northport Public School (K-12), Northport
 St. Mary High School, Lake Leelanau
 Suttons Bay High School, Suttons Bay

Lenawee County
 Addison High School, Addison
 Adrian High School, Adrian
 Blissfield High School, Blissfield
 Britton Deerfield High School, Britton
 Clinton High School, Clinton
 Holy Cross Children's Services, Clinton
 Hudson High School, Hudson
 Lenawee Christian School (K-12), Adrian
 Madison High School, Adrian
 Morenci Area High School, Morenci
 Onsted High School, Onsted
 Sand Creek High School, Sand Creek
 Tecumseh High School, Tecumseh

Livingston County
 Brighton High School, Brighton 
 Charyl Stockwell Preparatory Academy, Brighton
 Fowlerville High School, Fowlerville
 Hartland High School, Hartland
 Howell High School, Howell
 LEGACY, Hartland
 Kensington Woods High School, Howell
 Pinckney High School, Pinckney
 Brighton Alternative & Adult Education, Brighton

Luce County
 Newberry High School, Newberry, Michigan

Mackinac County
 Beaver Island High School, Beaver Island, Michigan
 Cedarville High School, Cedarville, Michigan
 Engadine Consolidated High School, Engadine, Michigan
 LaSalle High School, St. Ignace, Michigan
 Mackinac Island K-12 School, Mackinac Island, Michigan

Macomb County

 Anchor Bay High School, Fair Haven
 Austin Catholic High School, Chesterfield
 Center Line High School, Center Line
 Eastpointe High School, Eastpointe
 Eisenhower High School, Shelby Township
 Fraser High School, Fraser
 L'Anse Creuse High School, Harrison Township
 Mount Clemens High School, Mount Clemens
 New Haven High School, New Haven
 Richmond High School, Richmond
 Utica High School, Utica
 Romeo Engineering and Technology Center, Washington
 Romeo High School, Romeo
 Roseville High School, Roseville

Armada

 Armada High School
 Macomb Academy of Arts and Science

Clinton Township

 Chippewa Valley High School
 Clintondale High School
 International Academy of Macomb
 Macomb Academy
 Mohegan High School

Macomb

 Dakota High School
 L'Anse Creuse High School - North
 Lutheran High School North

St. Clair Shores

 Lake Shore High School
 Lakeview High School
 South Lake High School

Sterling Heights

 Career Preparation Center
 Henry Ford II High School
 Parkway Christian School
 Sterling Heights High School
 Stevenson High School
 Utica Alternative Learning Center
 Warren Consolidated School of Performing Arts

Warren

 Arts Academy in the Woods
 Community High School
 Conner Creek Academy
 Cousino High School
 De La Salle Collegiate High School
 Enterprise High School
 Fitzgerald High School
 Immaculate Conception Ukrainian Catholic High School
 Lincoln High School
 Macomb Christian High School
 Macomb Mathematics Science Technology Center
 Regina High School
 Warren Mott High School
 Warren Woods Tower High School

Manistee County
 Bear Lake High School, Bear Lake
 Brethren High School, Brethren
 Casman Alternative Academy (7-12), Manistee
 Manistee Catholic Central School (K-12), Manistee
 Manistee High School, Manistee
 Onekama High School, Onekama

Marquette County
 Gwinn High School, Gwinn, Michigan
 Ishpeming High School, Ishpeming, Michigan
 Marquette Senior High School, Marquette, Michigan
 Negaunee High School, Negaunee, Michigan
 North Star Academy, Marquette Township, Michigan
 Republic-Michigamme High School, Republic, Michigan
 Westwood High School, Ishpeming Township, Michigan

Mason County
 Free Soil Community High School (7-12), Free Soil
 Journey Junior/Senior High School, Scottville
 Ludington High School, Ludington
 Mason County Central High School, Scottville
 Mason County Eastern High School, Custer

Mecosta County
 Big Rapids High School, Big Rapids
 Brockway Christian Academy (K-12), Morley
 Chippewa Hills High School, Remus
 Community Christian School (K-12), Barryton
 Crossroads Charter Academy, Big Rapids
 Morley Stanwood High School, Morley
 Mosaic School (7-12), Remus
 New Directions High School, Big Rapids

Menominee County
 Carney-Nadeau School, Carney, Michigan
 Hannahville Indian School, Harris Township
 Menominee High School, Menominee, Michigan
 Nah Tah Wahsh Public School Academy, Wilson, Michigan
 North Central Area High School, Powers, Michigan
 Phoenix Alternative High School, Powers, Michigan
 Stephenson High School (MI), Stephenson, Michigan

Midland County
 Midland Public Schools
 Herbert Henry Dow High School, Midland
 Leiphart Alternative Education, Midland
 Midland High School, Midland
 Bullock Creek High School, Midland
 Calvary Baptist Academy (1-12), Midland
 Coleman High School, Coleman
 Meridian High School, Sanford
 Midland Academy of Advanced and Creative Studies, Midland
 Midland Christian School (K-12), Midland
 Windover High School, Midland

Missaukee County
 Lake City High School, Lake City
 McBain High School, McBain
 Northern Michigan Christian School (K-12), McBain

Monroe County
 Airport High School, Carleton
 Bedford High School , Temperance
 Dundee High School, Dundee
 Ida High School, Ida
 Jefferson High School, Monroe
 Mason High School, Erie
 Meadow Montessori High School, Monroe
 Milan High School, Milan
 Monroe High School, Monroe
 Orchard Center High School, Monroe
 St. Mary Catholic Central High School, Monroe
 State Line Christian School (K-12), Temperance
 Summerfield High School, Petersburg
 Whiteford High School, Ottawa Lake

Montcalm County
 Beth Haven Baptist Academy (K-12), Sheridan
 Carson City High School, Carson City
 Central Montcalm High School, Stanton
 Cornerstone Academy (6-12), Sheridan
 Cowden Lake Bible Academy (K-12), Coral
 Fellowship Baptist Academy (K-12), Carson City
 Fish Creek School (K-12), Carson City
 Grattan Academy (6-12), Greenville
 Great Lakes Adventist Academy (9-12), Cedar Lake
 Greenville High School (K-12), Greenville
 Lakeview High School, Lakeview
 Montabella High School, Blanchard
 Tri County High School, Howard City
 Vestaburg High School, Vestaburg

Montmorency County
 Atlanta High School, Atlanta
 Hillman Community Junior/Senior High School, Hillman

Muskegon County
 Calvary Christian Schools (K-12), Fruitport
 Fruitport High School, Fruitport
 Holton High School, Holton
 Mona Shores High School, Norton Shores
 Montague High School, Montague
 Muskegon Catholic Central High School, Muskegon
 Muskegon Heights Senior High School, Muskegon Heights
 Muskegon High School, Muskegon
 North Muskegon High School, North Muskegon
 Muskegon Technical Academy (5-12), Muskegon
 Oakridge High School, Muskegon
 Orchard View High School, Muskegon
 Ravenna High School, Ravenna
 Reeths-Puffer High School, Muskegon
 Western Michigan Christian High School, Muskegon
 Whitehall High School, Whitehall

Newaygo County
 Cross Academy (2-12), Paris
 Faith Baptist Church School (K-11), Fremont
 Fremont High School, Fremont
 Grant High School, Grant
 Hesperia High School, Hesperia
 Newaygo High School, Newaygo
 Providence Christian High School, Fremont
 White Cloud High School, White Cloud

Oakland County

 Addison High School, Addison
 Berkley High School, Berkley
 Brandon High School, Ortonville
 Clawson High School, Clawson
 Hazel Park High School/INVEST Roosevelt Alternative High School, Hazel Park
 Holly High School, Holly
 Oxford High School, Oxford
 St. Catherine of Siena Academy, Wixom
 St. Mary's Preparatory School, Orchard Lake
 Walled Lake Western High School, Walled Lake

Auburn Hills

 Auburn Hills Christian School (K-12)
 Avondale High School
 Havenwyck School (5-12)
 Heritage Christian School (3-12)
 Oakland Christian School (K-12)

Beverly Hills

 Detroit Country Day School
 Groves High School

Birmingham

 Eton Academy (1-12)
 Lincoln Street Alternative High School
 Roeper School
 Seaholm High School

Bloomfield Hills

 Academy of the Sacred Heart High School (K-12)
 Bloomfield Hills High School
 Bowers Academy
 Brother Rice High School
 Cranbrook Kingswood School
 International Academy
 Marian High School

Clarkston

 Clarkston High School
 Everest Catholic High School
 Springfield Christian Academy (K-12)

Commerce

 Walled Lake Central High School
 Walled Lake Northern High School

Farmington

 Farmington Central High School
 Farmington High School

Farmington Hills

 Mercy High School
 North Farmington High School
 Oakland Early College
 Oakland International Academy (7-12)

Ferndale

 Ferndale High School
 Jardon Vocational School

Highland

 Harbor High School
 Highland Hills Baptist Academy (K-12)
 Milford High School

Lake Orion

 Lake Orion Baptist School
 Lake Orion High School
 Learning Options High School

Madison Heights

 Bishop Foley Catholic High School
 Campbell Street Station Alternative High School
 Community High School
 Lamphere High School
 Madison High School

Novi

 Detroit Catholic Central High School
 Franklin Road Christian School (K-12)
 Koby International Academy (1-11)
 Novi Christian Academy (K-12)
 Novi High School

Oak Park

 Academy of Michigan (9-12)
 Beis Chaya Mushka Girls High School
 Beth Jacob School (1-12)
 Center for Advanced Studies and the Arts (CASA) (11-12)
 Oak Park High School
 Yeshiva Beth Yehudah
 Yeshivah Gedolah High School

Pontiac

 Notre Dame Preparatory School and Marist Academy (9-12)
 Baldwin Road Church Academy (1-11)
 Bethune Alternative Education (8-12)
 Pontiac Academy for Excellence (K-11)
 Pontiac High School

Rochester Hills

 Alternative Center for Education
 Lutheran High School Northwest
 Rochester Adams High School
 Rochester High School
 Rochester Hills Christian School (K-12)
 Stoney Creek High School

Royal Oak

 Churchill Community Education Center
 Kimball High School
 Royal Oak High School
 Shrine Catholic High School

South Lyon

 South Lyon East High School
 South Lyon High School

Southfield

 Advanced Technology Academy
 AGBU Alex and Marie Manoogian School (K-12)
 Akiva Hebrew Day School (K-12)
 Arthur Ashe Academy
 Bradford Academy High School
 Southfield High School
 Southfield Regional Academic Campus (7-12)
 Southfield Christian School (K-12)
 Yeshivas Darchei Torah - Girls (K-12)

Troy

 Athens High School
 Bethany Christian School (K-12)
 Christian Leadership Academy (K-12)
 International Academy East
 Troy College and Career High School
 Troy High School

Waterford

 Mount Zion Christian School (K-12)
 Our Lady of the Lakes High School
 Waterford Christian Academy (K-11)
 Waterford Kettering High School
 Waterford Mott High School
 Waterford Durant High School

West Bloomfield

 The Jean and Samuel Frankel Jewish Academy of Metropolitan Detroit (9-12)
 Laker Academy (9-12)
 Model High School
 West Bloomfield High School

White Lake Township

 International Academy
 Lakeland High School

Oceana County
 Hart High School, Hart
 Lakeshore Public Academy (K-12), Hart
 Oceana High School, Rothbury
 Pentwater Public School (K-12), Pentwater
 Shelby High School, Shelby
 Walkerville Middle/High School (7-12), Walkerville

Ogemaw County
 Bible Baptist Church School (1-12), Lupton
 Ogemaw Heights High School, West Branch
 Ogemaw Hills Christian School (K-12), West Branch
 Second Chance Academy (5-12), Roscommon

Ontonagon County
 Ewen-Trout Creek School, Ewen, Michigan
 Ontonagon Area Senior High School, Ontonagon, Michigan

Osceola County
 Daystar Christian Academy (K-12), Evart
 Evart High School, Evart
 Genesis High School, Evart
 Heritage Christian Academy (1-11), Reed City
 Marion High School, Marion
 Pine River High School, LeRoy
 Reed City High School, Reed City

Oscoda County
 Fairview High School, Fairview
 Mio-AuSable High School, Mio

Otsego County
 Calvary Baptist School (K-11), Gaylord
 Gaylord High School, Gaylord
 Grace Baptist Christian School (K-12), Gaylord
 Johannesburg-Lewiston High School, Johannesburg
 St. Mary Cathedral High School, Gaylord
 Vanderbilt Area School (K-12), Vanderbilt

Ottawa County
 Allendale High School, Allendale
 Black River Public School, Holland
 Calvary Schools of Holland (K-12), Holland
Central High School, Grand Haven
 Coopersville High School, Coopersville
 Daystar Christian Academy (9-12), Holland
 Grand Haven High School, Grand Haven
 Holland Christian High School, Holland
 Holland High School, Holland
 Hudsonville Public Schools
 Hudsonville High School, Hudsonville
 Hudsonville Freshman Campus, Hudsonville
 Jenison High School, Jenison
 Lakeshore Baptist Academy (K-12), Grand Haven
 Spring Lake High School, Spring Lake
 Unity Christian High School, Hudsonville
 West Ottawa High School, Holland
 Zeeland Public Schools
 Zeeland East High School, Zeeland
 Zeeland West High School,closed Zeeland
 Zeeland Christian School (K-12), Zeeland

Presque Isle County
 Onaway High School, Onaway
 Posen High School, Posen
 Presque Isle Academy, Onaway
 Rogers City High/Middle School, Rogers City

Roscommon County
 Houghton Lake High School, Houghton Lake
 Immanuel Christian School (1-11), Roscommon
 Roscommon High School, Roscommon
 Second Chance Academy (7-12), Houghton Lake

Saginaw County

 Birch Run High School, Birch Run
 Chesaning Union High School, Chesaning
 Frankenmuth High School, Frankenmuth
 Freeland High School, Freeland
 Hemlock High School, Hemlock
 Merrill High School, Merrill
 St. Charles High School, St. Charles

Bridgeport

 Bridgeport Baptist Academy (K-12)
 Bridgeport High School

Saginaw

 Arthur Hill High School
 Buena Vista High School
 Carrollton High School
 Community Baptist Christian School
 Grace Baptist Christian School (K-12)
 Michigan Lutheran Seminary
 Nouvel Catholic Central High School
 Saginaw Arts and Sciences Academy
 Saginaw Career Complex (11-12)
 Saginaw High School
 Saginaw Learn to Earn Academy (10-12)
 Sheridan Road Baptist School (K-12)
 Swan Valley High School
 Valley Lutheran High School

Saginaw Township

 Heritage High School
 Mackinaw High School

St. Clair County
 Archdiocese of Detroit
 Cardinal Mooney Catholic College Preparatory (9-12), Marine City
 Academic Transitional Academy (9-10), Port Huron
 Academy of Style, Marysville
 Algonac High School, Algonac
 Blue Water Learning Academy (7-12), Algonac
 Capac Junior/Senior High School, Capac
 Health Careers Academy, Marysville
 Hospitality Academy, Marysville
 Information Technology Academy, Marysville
 Jefferson Adult Learning Center, Port Huron
 Landmark Academy, Kimball
 Marine City High School, Marine City
 Marysville High School, Marysville
 Memphis High School, Memphis
 New Life Christian Academy (K-12), Kimball
 Phoenix Alternative School (7-12), Yale
 Port Huron High School, Port Huron
 Port Huron Northern High School, Port Huron
 Port Huron South High School, Port Huron
 Public Safety Academy, Marysville
 Riverview East High School, St. Clair
 St. Clair County Learning Academy (7-12)
 St. Clair High School, St. Clair
 St. Clair Technical Education Center, Marysville
 Yale High School, Yale

St. Joseph County
 Burr Oak High School, Burr Oak
 Centreville Covered Bridge High School, Centreville
 Centreville High School, Centreville
 Colon High School, Colon
 Constantine High School, Constantine
 Heartwood Renaissance Academy (8-11), Sturgis
 Howardsville Christian School (K-12), Marcellus
 Huss Academy, Three Rivers
 KAMSC (Kalamazoo Area Mathematics and Science Center), Kalamazoo
 Lake Area Christian School (K-12), Sturgis
 Mendon Junior/Senior High School, Mendon
 Nottawa Christian Day School (1-12), Nottawa
 Sturgis Christian School (K-12), Sturgis
 Sturgis High School, Sturgis
 Three Rivers High School, Three Rivers
 White Pigeon High School, White Pigeon

Sanilac County
 Brown City High School, Brown City
 Carsonville-Port Sanilac High School, Carsonville
 Cros-Lex High School, Croswell
 Deckerville High School, Deckerville
 Marlette High School, Marlette
 Peak Alternative High School, Croswell (defunct)
 Peck Junior/Senior High School, Peck
 Sandusky High School, Sandusky

Schoolcraft County
 Manistique High School, Manistique, Michigan

Shiawassee County
 Byron High School, Byron
 Corunna High School, Corunna
 Durand Area High School, Durand
 Laingsburg High School, Laingsburg
 Lincoln High School, Owosso
 Morrice Junior/Senior High School, Morrice
 New Lothrop High School, New Lothrop
 Owosso Christian School (K-12), Owosso
 Owosso High School, Owosso
 Perry High School, Perry
 Spring Vale Academy (9-12), Owosso

Tuscola County
 Akron-Fairgrove Junior/Senior High School, Fairgrove
 Caro Alternative High School, Caro
 Caro High School, Caro
 Cass City High School, Cass City
 Deford Christian Academy (K-12), Deford
 Juniata Christian School (K-12), Vassar
 Kingston High School, Kingston
 Mayville High School, Mayville
 Millington Jr./Sr. High School, Millington
 Reese High School, Reese
 Unionville-Sebewaing Area High School, Sebewaing
 Vassar Senior High School, Vassar

Van Buren County
 Bangor High School, Bangor
 Bloomingdale High School, Bloomingdale
 Covert High School, Covert
 Decatur High School, Decatur
 Gobles High School, Gobles
 Hartford High School, Hartford
 Lawrence Junior/Senior High School, Lawrence
 Lawton High School, Lawton
 Mattawan High School, Mattawan
 Michigan Avenue Academy (7-12), Paw Paw
 Paw Paw High School, Paw Paw
 L.C. Mohr High School, South Haven

Washtenaw County
 Chelsea High School, Chelsea
 Dexter High School, Dexter
 Manchester High School, Manchester
 North Sharon Christian School (K-12), Grass Lake
 Whitmore Lake High School, Whitmore Lake

Ann Arbor

 Ann Arbor Academy (4-12)
 Central Academy (K-12)
 Clonlara School (K-12)
 Community High School
 Fr. Gabriel Richard High School
 Greenhills School
 Huron High School
 Michigan Islamic Academy (PK-11)
 Pioneer High School
 Roberto Clemente Student Development Center
 Rudolf Steiner of Ann Arbor (K-12)
 Skyline High School
 Washtenaw Technical Middle College

Saline

 Saline Christian School (K-12)
 Saline High School
 Washtenaw Christian Academy (K-12)

Ypsilanti

 Arbor Preparatory High School
 Apostolic Christian Academy (K-12)
 Calvary Christian Academy (K-12)
 Center for Occupational and Personalized Education (6-12)
 Lincoln High School
 Pineview Christian Academy (K-12)
 Ypsilanti Community High School

Wayne County

 Anderson High School, Southgate
 Calvary Christian Academy (1-12), Rockwood
 Ecorse Community High School, Ecorse
 Flat Rock Community High School, Flat Rock
 Garden City High School, Garden City
 Grosse Ile High School, Grosse Ile
 Grosse Pointe North High School, Grosse Pointe Woods
 Grosse Pointe South High School, Grosse Pointe Farms
 Huron High School, New Boston
 Lincoln Park High School, Lincoln Park
 Northville High School, Northville
 Oscar A. Carlson High School, Gibraltar
 River Rouge High School, River Rouge
 Trenton High School, Trenton
 University Liggett School, Grosse Pointe
 Wayne Memorial High School, Wayne
 Woodhaven High School, Brownstown

Allen Park

 Allen Park Community School
 Allen Park High School
 Cabrini High School
 Inter-City Baptist School (K-12)

Belleville

 Belleville High School
 Metro Baptist School (K-12)
 Van Buren Alternative Education School (7-12)

Canton

 Agape Christian Academy (K-12)
 Canton High School
 Canton Preparatory High School
 Plymouth Christian Academy (K-12)
 Plymouth High School
 Salem High School

Dearborn

 Advanced Technology Academy (K-12)
 American Islamic Academy (K-12)
 Dearborn Center for Math, Science and Technology
 Dearborn High School
 Divine Child High School, Dearborn
 Edsel Ford High School
 Fordson High School
 Henry Ford Academy
 Michael Berry Career Center

Dearborn Heights

 Annapolis High School
 Clara B. Ford Academy
 Crestwood High School
 Hamilton J. Robichaud Junior/Senior High School
 Star International Academy (K-12)

Detroit

Detroit Public Schools Zoned/Technical Centers

 Breithaupt Career & Tech Center
 Central High School
 Cody High School
 Denby High School
 East English Village Preparatory Academy
 Golightly Career & Tech Center
 Ford High School
 King High School
 Mumford High School
 Northwestern High School
 Pershing High School
 Randolph Career & Tech Center
 Southeastern High School
 Western International High School

Detroit Public Schools Magnet/Specialized

 Academy of the Americas
 Barsamian Preparatory Center
 Cass Technical High School
 Communication & Media Arts High School
 Crosman Alternative High School
 Davis Aerospace Technical High School
 Detroit High School for Technology
 Detroit International Academy for Young Women (PK-12)
 Detroit School of Arts
 Millennium School
 Douglass Academy for Young Men (6-12)
 Osborn High School
 Renaissance High School
 West Side Academy

Charter Schools

 Aisha Shule/WEB Dubois Prep School (K-12)
 Al-Ikhlas Training Academy (K-12)
 Allen Academy (K-11)
 Benjamin Carson Academy (5-12)
 Casa Richard Academy (9-12)
 César Chávez Academy
 Charlotte Forten Academy (5-12)
 Clinton St. Greater Beth Temple (K-12)
 Detroit Academy of Arts and Sciences (K-12)
 Detroit Association Black Orgs (9-12)
 Detroit School of Industrial Arts (6-12)
 George Crockett Academy (K-12)
 High School of Commerce & Business Administration
 Hope of Detroit Academy (7-12)
 Lincoln-King High School
 Louisiana Homes School (7-12)
 Marvin L. Winans Academy of Performing Arts High School
 Michigan Health Academy (9-12)
 New Center Academy (4-12)
 New Galilee (9-12)
 Old Redford Academy Preparatory High School
 Todd-Phillips Learning Resource (5-11)
 Universal Academy (K-11)
 University Preparatory Academy (K-12)
 Urban Arts (9-12)
 Voyageur Academy (K-12)
 Weston Technical Academy (6-12)

Private Schools

 Benedictine High School
 Holy Redeemer High School
 Loyola High School
 University of Detroit Jesuit High School and Academy
 Westside Christian Academy (K-12)

Hamtramck

 Frontier International Academy (6-12)
 Hamtramck High School

Harper Woods

 Chandler Park Academy
 Harper Woods High School
 Heart Academy (9-12)
 Regina High School

Inkster

 Academy of Inkster
 Cherry Hill School of Performing Arts (K-12)
 Inkster High School
 Peterson-Warren Academy (K-12)

Livonia

 Churchill High School
 Clarenceville High School
 Franklin High School
 Galilean Baptist Educ. Ministry (K-12)
 Ladywood High School
 Livonia Career Technical Center
 McKinley School
 Stevenson High School
 Western Wayne Skills Center

Melvindale

 Academy for Business and Technology (6-12)
 Melvindale High School

Redford

 Covenant High and Academy (5-12) 
 Michigan Technical Academy High School
 Redford Union High School
 St. Agatha High School
 Thurston High School

Riverview

 Gabriel Richard High School
 Riverview Community High School

Romulus

 Community High/Middle School
 Michigan Automotive Academy (9-12)
 Romulus Senior High School
 Summit Academy North High School

Taylor

 Light and Life Christian School (K-12)
 Taylor Career and Technical Center
 Taylor Center Baptist Academy (K-12)
 Taylor High School
 Taylor Preparatory High School
 Tinkham Alternative High School
 Titan Academy Alternative Education

Westland

 John Glenn High School
 Lutheran High School Westland
 Universal Learning Academy
 Westland Christian Academy (1-12)
 William D. Ford Career-Technical Center

Wyandotte

 Our Lady of Mount Carmel High School
 Roosevelt High School

Wexford County
 Buckley Community School (K-12a), Buckley
 Cadillac Heritage Christian (K-12), Cadillac
 Cadillac High School, Cadillac
 Cooley School, Cadillac
 Manton High School, Manton
 Mesick Consolidated High School, Mesick

See also 
 List of school districts in Michigan
 List of schools in the Roman Catholic Archdiocese of Detroit

References

Michigan
High